Psilosticha is a genus of moths in the family Geometridae first described by Edward Meyrick in 1892.

Species
The genus includes the following species:
Psilosticha absorpta (Walker, 1860) Australia
Psilosticha attacta (Walker, 1860) Australia
Psilosticha loxoschema (Turner, 1947) Australia
Psilosticha mactaria (Guenée, 1857) Australia
Psilosticha oresitropha Turner, 1947 Australia
Psilosticha pristis (Meyrick, 1892) Australia

References

Boarmiini